Budhanilkantha is a city and municipality in Kathmandu district of Bagmati province of Nepal. It is the 3rd largest city in the Kathmandu Valley after Kathmandu and Lalitpur. As per 2021 Nepal census, the city population was 179,688 and 26,678 households. 

It was established on 2 December 2014 by merging the former Village development committees Hattigauda, Khadka Bhadrakali, Chapali Bhadrakali, Mahankal, Bishnu, Chunikhel and Kapan. The city is situated at the foot of Shivapuri hill. At the time of the 2011 Nepal census, the VDC of Budhanilkantha had a population of 15,421. 

The municipality is named after the sacred Budhanilkantha Temple. The Budhanilkantha School is also located within the municipality.

Gallery

See also
 Shivapuri Nagarjun National Park
 Pasikot

References

External links

 Vishnu Sleeps in the Hanuman Dhoka: Sleeping Vishnu

Populated places in Kathmandu District